Machanaim is an organization dealing with the spiritual absorption of Jewish people from the former USSR in Israel. The movement's work and its goals spawned its name, the Hebrew word  from  meaning "two camps", in this case referring to Jerusalem and Moscow. 

Machanaim's founders are Rabbi Dr. Zeev Dashevsky,  Dr. Pinchas Polonsky, and Dr. Michael Kara-Ivanov. Machanaim began in Moscow behind the Iron Curtain in 1979, during the period of Brezhnev stagnation, as a group of young people who gathered to study Jewish history and tradition and pass on this knowledge on to their fellow Jews. Over time it developed into an organized underground network for studying Torah, Jewish philosophy, and Jewish law. Almost all the group members were refuseniks. Classes were sometimes interrupted by the KGB.

In 1987 most of the Machanaim activists received permission to emigrate to Israel. There they set two main goals: to work with new immigrants and to provide assistance in Jewish education for those Jews still in the CIS. 

The organization has produced many books and classes, especially for conversion to Judaism. Its other main projects include teaching Judaism via the media, running a synagogue and other activities in Ma'aleh Adumim. It is an important proponent of Religious Zionism among Russian-speaking Jews.

Other uses of the name

Machanaim is also the name of a popular game played at Jewish summer camps and schools. It is sometimes spelled Machanayim.

References 
 Machanaim online
 From Russia with faith, Dan Izenberg, Jerusalem Post, 17.10.1997
 "Machanaim: The search for a spiritual revival of Judaism among Russian Jews" by Miriam Kitrossky, Michael Kara-Ivanov and Pinchas Polonsky in "Conversations. Orthodoxy and Diversity", issue 7, spring 2010/5770, pp. 54–65

Jewish outreach
Jews and Judaism in the Soviet Union
Jewish organizations established in 1979
1979 establishments in the Soviet Union